Larix × czekanowskii is a larch species, likely a hybrid between Siberian larch (Larix sibirica) and Dahurian larch (Larix gmelinii).

Description
Larix × czekanowskii occurs where their ranges meet in central Siberia. It is intermediate between its parent species in all characters.

References

czekanowskii
Trees of Siberia
Least concern plants
Plant nothospecies
Taxonomy articles created by Polbot
Deciduous conifers